Lacul Verde (literally Green Lake) is a natural freshwater lake of the Ocna Sibiului mine, Romania. It is the only major freshwater lake of the mine, with the other lakes being salt lakes. The Lacul Vrăjitoarelor is also a freshwater lake, but it is too small and the condition is too poor for swimming. Lacul Verde is located in the city of Ocna Sibiului, Sibiu County, Transylvania, Romania.

History 

The origin of the lake is the collapse of two nearby, unrecognized saltworks, which were exploited at the same time and later abandoned due to water infiltration.

Information 
Surface: 
Maximum depth: 
Salinity: 8-9 g/l

Lakes of the salt mine 
 Auster 
 Lake Avram Iancu-Ocniţa
 Balta cu Nămol 
 Brâncoveanu 
 Cloşca 
 Crişan
 Lacul Fără Fund 
 Gura Minei 
 Horea 
 Mâţelor 
 Negru
 Pânzelor 
 Rândunica 
 Verde (Freshwater lake)
 Vrăjitoarelor (Freshwater lake)

References

Lakes of Sibiu County